Andrea "Andi" Oliver (born 1964) is a British chef, television and radio broadcaster, and former singer. She is best known for her appearances on the BBC cooking show the Great British Menu.

Early career 
Oliver is a former member of the band Rip Rig + Panic who appeared on an episode of Series 1 of The Young Ones. She used to co-host the Channel 4 television show Baadasss TV alongside Ice-T and frequently appears on the BBC World Service and the BBC's annual coverage of the Glastonbury Festival.

Other music projects 
After 1983, Oliver became involved in Kalimba, an African inspired band. In 1990 she joined forces with her brother, forming the Mighty Hog.

In April 2007, she started presenting a six-part cookery show Neneh and Andi Dish it Up with her friend Neneh Cherry for BBC2.

Projects 
 Host of Truth About Food
 Host of The Selector, a radio show for the British Council
 Host of BBC Four first-ever Radio 3 World Music Awards
 Took part in the charity performance of The Vagina Monologues at the Royal Albert Hall
 Took part in the Changing Cityscapes series for the BBC.
 In 2009 Oliver took part in BBC flagship drama No. 1 Ladies Detective Agency, set in Botswana.
 In Summer 2012, she was a guest judge on the TV show Food Glorious Food, presented by Carol Vorderman during the Harrogate Regional Heats, first broadcast on 27 February 2013.
 Summer 2014, opens own kitchen, Sugarshack
 Regular panelist on The Kitchen Cabinet on BBC Radio 4 alongside Jay Rayner, Henry Dimbleby and Angela Hartnett
 Co-hosts Food Networks The Big Eat alongside Andy Bates and Ching He Huang
 Co-host of BBC's Christmas Kitchen with Matt Tebbutt - December 2016
 2018, took part in "Eight Go Rallying: The Road To Saigon" with her daughter Miquita Oliver. They drove a 1959 Morris Minor.
 Replaced Prue Leith as permanent judge on the Great British Menu with Matthew Fort and Oliver Peyton, but then stepped away from the judge role and replaced Susan Calman as presenter
 2022, documentary, The Caribbean with Andi and Miquita.

Personal life 
Oliver was born in London. Her mother's family is of Antiguan descent. Oliver’s daughter is television presenter Miquita Oliver. Her brother Sean died in 1990 of sickle cell anaemia aged 27.

References

External links
 Andrea Oliver page at BBC.

Living people
BBC television presenters
BBC Radio 4 presenters
Television personalities from London
English chefs
English people of Antigua and Barbuda descent
Rip Rig + Panic members
1964 births